Handmade Cities is the first studio album by Australian guitarist Plini. The album was composed, produced, arranged and mixed by Plini.

Reception

Sputnik Music gave the album 4/5.
Peter Hodgson of Beat commented that Plini is "making music of such world-class quality on his first full-length record".

Steve Vai described this album as "one of the finest, forward-thinking, melodic, rhythmically and harmonically deep instrumental guitar records [he has] ever heard".

The title track gained some attention when the guitar rhythm during its solo was claimed to be plagiarized for that of the guitar solo in American pop singer Doja Cat's 2020 metal version of her single "Say So" performed at the MTV Europe Music Awards ceremony. The next month Plini reported that Doja Cat left him an apologetic message through social media. Regarding the alleged plagiarism, Plini stated "the lack of prior communication about it or proper credit upon release is disappointing but not particularly surprising in a sector of the industry that is usually more interested in clout than creativity. (it's being sorted now, but would have been cooler a million views ago)".

Track listing 
All tracks composed by Plini.

Personnel

Musicians 
 Plini – guitars
 Simon Grove – bass
 Troy Wright – drums

Production 
 Simon Grove – drums mixing
 Plini – mixing
 Ermin Hamidovic – mastering

References 

2016 debut albums
Self-released albums